Paxton is a small village near the B6461 and the B6460, in the pre-1975 ancient county of Berwickshire, now an administrative area of the Scottish Borders region of Scotland. It lies 1 mile west of the border with Northumberland, near Berwick-upon-Tweed. It is a traditional, country village surrounded by farmland, and its closest market towns are Duns and Berwick-upon-Tweed.
               
Paxton is beside the River Tweed which is the border at that point and on Whiteadder Water. Paxton is also the location of Paxton House.

Linking Scotland and England, the nearby Union Chain Bridge, opened in 1820, was the longest wrought iron suspension bridge in the world. It was also the first of its kind in Britain.

History

Traditionally home to villagers working on the land or in the salmon fishery on the Tweed, Paxton is said to be the birthplace of the song Robin Adair:

Paxton's a fine snug place, Robin Adair,

It's a wondrous couthie place, Robin Adair;

Let Whiteadder rin a spate,

Or the wind blow at ony rate,

Yet I'll meet thee on the gait, Robin Adair.

See also

Paxton House

External links

CANMORE/RCAHMS record for Paxton, Village Hall
CANMORE/RCAHMS record for Paxton, General
SCRAN image: Salmon Fishers Hauling In Their Catch At Paxton On The River Tweed
GEOGRAPH image: Church of Scotland, Paxton
 Paxton Village Hall official website

Berwickshire
Villages in the Scottish Borders
Hutton Castle